Paul Temple Returns is a 1952 British crime film directed by Maclean Rogers and starring John Bentley, Patricia Dainton and Peter Gawthorne. Known in the U.S. as Bombay Waterfront, it was the fourth and last in the series of Paul Temple films distributed by Butcher's Film Service: the others are Send for Paul Temple (1946) (with Anthony Hulme as Paul Temple), Calling Paul Temple (1948, the first with John Bentley in the title role), and Paul Temple's Triumph (1950). Aside from Bentley, the other actors were different from those in the earlier film series. It was released in the United States under the alternative title Bombay Waterfront.

The film was shot at Walton Studios with sets designed by the art director George Paterson. Some location shooting also took place in London. The film was distributed by Butcher's Film Service which specialised in releasing lower-budget productions.

Plot
A series of seemingly unconnected murders takes place in London, with the murderer leaving a calling card signed "The Marquess". Aspiring novelist and amateur detective Paul Temple and his wife Steve are called in to investigate. An ancient papyrus scroll recently excavated in Egypt by the menacing archaeologist Sir Felix Raybourne (played by Christopher Lee) appears to hold the key to the murders. It details an antidote for all narcotic drugs, which if put to use could put an end to lucrative criminal drug cartels in London. The screenplay was adapted from the radio serial Paul Temple Intervenes, broadcast in November 1942.

Cast

Critical reception
TV Guide called the film a "standard murder mystery," and Britmovie agreed, adding, "b-movie director Maclean Rogers keeps the story moving at a brisk pace and makes good use of exterior locations." As with the previous films in this series, the location footage (this time London, particularly at night), is highly evocative of the period. Renown Pictures has issued all four on DVD.

References

External links

1952 films
British crime films
1952 crime films
Films directed by Maclean Rogers
Films based on radio series
Films produced by Ernest G. Roy
British black-and-white films
Films shot at Nettlefold Studios
Films set in London
Films shot in London
Butcher's Film Service films
1950s English-language films
1950s British films